Elizabeth B. Nichols was a Union nurse during the American Civil War.

Civil War service
Nichols began her wartime service when her husband was stationed in Chicago at the time, after being taken prisoner at Harper's Ferry, and was ill. Nichols arrived for service on October 17, 1862. After arriving at his regiment, Nichols became a field nurse, traveling throughout the east coast with the regiment, including service at Washington, D.C., Baltimore, Fairfax, and Gettysburg.

Nichols slept on the ground on piles of straw and dealt with numerous outbreaks of illnesses, such as typhoid fever and smallpox. "I have passed through scenes that I shall never forget," she wrote. Nichols served for about two years, the last sixteen months at the Invalid Corps camp near Washington, until her husband was discharged.

She wrote about her memories of war nursing in Mary A. Gardner Holland's Our Army Nurses (1897).

Personal life 
Elizabeth B. Nichols' husband was Stillman Nichols.

References

External links 
 

Women in the American Civil War
American Civil War nurses
American women nurses
Date of birth missing
Date of death missing